Pelli Pustakam may refer to:
 Pelli Pustakam (1991 film), a Telugu-language romantic comedy film
 Pelli Pustakam (2013 film), an Indian Telugu-language film